Harsin (also Romanized as Harsīn) is a city and capital of Harsin County, Kermanshah Province, Iran. At the 2006 census, its population was 51,562, in 12,001 families.

Demographics 
The city is populated by different Kurdish tribes including the Osmanvand and the Jalalvand who speak Laki.

References

External links

 Iran Travel Guide: Harsin

Populated places in Harsin County
Cities in Kermanshah Province

Kurdish settlements in Kermanshah Province